The Band of the Central Army House of the General Staff of the Armed Forces of Kyrgyzstan commonly known as the Band of the General Staff, also formerly known as the Band of the Ministry of Defense is a military musical group of the Kyrgyz Army. It was officially founded on October 7, 1992, by the Order of the Chairman of the State Committee of the Kyrgyz Republic for Defense Affairs, as the successor to the band of the 8th Guards Panfilov Division. In connection with the reorganization of the Armed Forces in December 1995, the band was put under the direct command of the Central Army House of the Armed Forces General Staff.

Captain Jumatay uulu Dastan has been the band director since 2011. The band has the following ensembles:
 Exemplary Band
 Brass Band
 Symphonic Band
 Big Band

Popular Kyrgyz artists such as Mirbek Atabekov, Tata Ulan, and Gulzhigit Kalykov have performed with the band's symphonic band. All 40 members of the band range between 20 and 50 years old.

Protocol duties

All members of the band are active duty soldiers as they are trained with infantry knowledge. The band has frequently performed the National Anthem of Kyrgyzstan on Kyrgyz Television, and has a complete repertoire of the national anthems of foreign countries in its archives. It commonly works with the song and dance ensemble of the armed forces and with the Honour Guard Battalion of the 701st Military Unit of the National Guard in actively participating in military parades, theatrical performances and other events in the country. Notable parade performances include those on Independence Day, Defender of the Fatherland Day and Victory Day (9 May). It also takes part in the opening of the Supreme Council.

Public and international events
One of the more high-profile military tattoos it has taken part in is the Shanghai Cooperation Organization Military Tattoo, of which it has attended all 5 editions. It was in fact the first international trip the band took, arriving in China in the summer of 2014 by way of a government provided bus. It also has conducted flashmobs at public places such as Manas International Airport where it performs popular music.

Repertoire
Kyz kuumai March
Kara Zhorgo March
March of the Preobrazhensky Regiment
Triumph Of The Winners
Slow March of Tankman Winners
Slow March of Officer Schools
Presidential Fanfare
Signal "Listen to all!"
Farewell of Slavianka
"Air March"
Funeral March

Uniform
The official uniform color band is the same as the uniform of the National Guard (the most recent version being implemented in 2015) is dark turquoise, with the summer uniform being a tunic worn over a buttoned up shirt and a tie accompanied by trousers of the same color, as well as boots, white gloves and a peaked hat. The winter uniform is a grey overcoat that is worn over the regular uniform while a traditional Russian Ushanka hat is worn. The director of the band wears a more recognizable white summer tunic instead of a turquoise one.

External links

Флешмоб к 8 марта
Военный оркестр Кыргызстана в фестиваль военных оркестров государств-членов ШОС "Труба мира 2018" в Пекине
Bamboleo от оркестра Министерства обороны Кыргызстана
Флешмоб в аэропорту «Манас» с участием оркестра Генштаба
Аскер көрсөтмө оркестринде эмгектенген жигиттердин жашоосу / Таң Шоола / НТС

Other Kyrgyz Military Bands

Аскердик оркестр / НТС / Таң-Шоола / 10.05.16
Ыйык милдет Аскердик оркестр 08.04.17
Таңкы беш: Улуттук гвардиянын оркестри

References

Military bands
Kyrgyz music
General Staff (Kyrgyzstan)
Brass bands
Musical groups established in 1992
1992 establishments in Kyrgyzstan
Military units and formations of Kyrgyzstan